The High Commissioner of Australia to Sri Lanka is an officer of the Australian Department of Foreign Affairs and Trade and the head of the High Commission of the Commonwealth of Australia to the Democratic Socialist Republic of Sri Lanka in Colombo. The High Commissioner has the rank and status of an Ambassador Extraordinary and Plenipotentiary and also holds non-resident accreditation as High Commissioner to the Maldives since 1974. The High Commissioner since July 2022 is Paul Stephens.

History of relations and office

Sri Lanka and Australia have enjoyed official diplomatic relations since December 1946, following the decision of the British Government to grant limited self-government to Ceylon, with the first parliamentary elections being held by late 1947. As a consequence of the limited sovereign status of Ceylon (possessing neither Dominion status nor full independence) the government of Ben Chifley made the decision to appoint a Commissioner, who had diplomatic standing but not the same powers or rank as a full High Commissioner. In the announcement the Australian Government clarified that: "The new title of Commissioner for the appointment [was] chosen because of the unique status which Ceylon will enjoy in the Empire. It will have a legislature patterned on Dominion Parliaments, but as it will lack Dominion or foreign country status, it would be inappropriate for Australia to appoint either a High Commissioner or a Minister." On 16 January 1947 the first Commissioner was appointed, Charles Frost, a former Labor member of parliament and minister who had lost his seat at the 1946 election. When Ceylon was granted Dominion status, Frost was upgraded to full High Commissioner and was present at the swearing-in of the first Governor-General of Ceylon, Sir Henry Monck-Mason Moore, on 4 February 1948.

Frost's appointment did not go without protest however, given the political nature of the appointment, and his performance came under increased scrutiny in late 1948 when Australian businessman V. M. Segal criticised him for neglecting Australia's fledgling trade interests in the country and not having the proper credentials to serve in such a post: "With his staff, he is kept there at considerable expense to this country. It is the biggest sinecure I know." With a change in government, the new Liberal government of Prime Minister Robert Menzies made the decision to terminate Frost's appointment early (he had been commissioned to serve a five-year term) on 5 October 1950. On 19 January 1951 the Minister for External Affairs, Percy Spender, appointed a career diplomat, Dr John Burton, to succeed Frost as High Commissioner. However, Burton's tenure also proved short-lived when he resigned his office on 28 March 1951, notifying Spender that he had resigned to contest the April 1951 federal election as a Labor candidate for the seat of Lowe against the sitting member, William McMahon (he was unsuccessful). On 22 May 1972, the Government of Ceylon approved a new republican constitution that renamed the country 'Sri Lanka' and changed its status to that of a Republic within the Commonwealth.

Relations with the Maldives

In 1974, Australia established diplomatic relations with the Republic of Maldives and the High Commissioner in Colombo received non-resident accreditation as High Commissioner to the Maldives.  Between July 1982 and October 2016, and since 1 February 2020, the Australian High Commissioner to Sri Lanka has also been High Commissioner to the Maldives. Between 1974 and 1982, and from October 2016 to 1 February 2020, this office was as Ambassador.

Office-holders

Notes
 Also served as non-resident Ambassador to the Republic of Maldives, between 1974 and 1982, and between October 2016 to 1 February 2020.
 Also served as non-resident High Commissioner to the Republic of Maldives, between July 1982 and October 2016, and since 1 February 2020.

See also
Australia–Sri Lanka relations
Foreign relations of Australia

References

External links
 Australian High Commission, Colombo

 
High Commissioners of Australia to the Maldives
Sri Lanka
Maldives and the Commonwealth of Nations
Sri Lanka and the Commonwealth of Nations
Australia